Zach Abbott (born 13 May 2006) is an English footballer who plays as a defender for Nottingham Forest.

Club career
On 23 August 2022, Abbott debuted for Nottingham Forest during a 3–0 win over Grimsby Town in the EFL Cup. Abbott was a member of the academy team which reached the final of the FA Youth Cup for the first time in the club’s history and on 11 May 2022 played the full 90 minutes as they finished runners up to Manchester United at Old Trafford.

International career
Abbott has featured in the England youth set-up, making his debut for the England U16 against the Netherlands U16 in the Montaigu Tournament.

Career statistics

References

2006 births
Living people
Place of birth missing (living people)
English footballers
Nottingham Forest F.C. players
Association football defenders
England youth international footballers